Anjali Paragsingh (born 24 February 1997) is a Surinamese female badminton player.

Achievements

BWF International Challenge/Series
Women's Doubles

 BWF International Challenge tournament
 BWF International Series tournament
 BWF Future Series tournament

References

External links 
 

Living people
1997 births
Surinamese female badminton players
Surinamese people of Indian descent